Vecbebri Manor is a manor house in the historical region of Vidzeme, in northern Latvia.

History 
Vecbebri Manor was built during the first half of the 19th century in Classical style. Severely damaged by fire in 1905, the manor was later restored under the supervision of architect Vilhelms Bokslafs. It became a school building in 1922, and has housed the Bebri comprehensive boarding primary school (Bebru vispārizglītojošā internātpamatskola) since 1996.

See also
List of palaces and manor houses in Latvia

References

External links
  Vecbebri Manor
  Bebri Comprehensive Boarding Primary School

Manor houses in Latvia